Misaki Doi was the defending champion, but lost in the first round to Lauren Davis.

Monica Niculescu won the title, defeating Petra Kvitová in the final, 6–4, 6–0.

Seeds

Draw

Finals

Top half

Bottom half

Qualifying

Seeds

Qualifiers

Draw

First qualifier

Second qualifier

Third qualifier

Fourth qualifier

References 
 Main draw
 Qualifying draw

BGL Luxembourg Open - Singles
Luxembourg Open
2016 in Luxembourgian tennis